Andrzej Krukowski (born November 30, 1961) is a Polish actor. In 2003 he starred in the film An Ancient Tale: When the Sun Was a God under Jerzy Hoffman.

References

External links

Polish male film actors
1961 births
Living people